Olga de Alaketu or Mother Olga (c.1925 – September 29, 2005) was a prominent Candomblé high priestess, who was influential in promoting Candomblé and distancing it from Catholicism.

Early life and career
Olga Alaketu was born in the Ketu Nation of West Africa in 1925 and descended from a long line of priestesses and queens.  She was brought by the Portuguese to Bahia, Brazil, and forced into a life of slavery.  

She used the customs and traditions of her homeland to establish herself in Afro-Brazilian society to differentiate herself from the slave identity.  With the help of others she integrated both European and African culture together in order to strengthen the Afro-Brazilian culture and religious tradition of Candomblé.  

She played a central role in many spiritual initiatives within her community, such as giving sermons on inequality and injustice. Furthermore, she served as an instrumental part of the local university's Psychiatry department to help the local people discuss their problems, and those who suffered with mental illness. Her temple attracted many prominent people including the writer Jorge Amado, and the French anthropologist Pierre Verger. 

When the Ile Maroia Laji was declared a national heritage site, Cultural Minister Gilberto Gil said of Alaketu:

"In the last forty years, we can consider Mother Olga as the greatest proponent of the religion of the Orishas in all Brazil."

Ketu Nation and Olga 

The Ketu nation into which Olga de Alaketu was born has a long history of religious oral tradition.  Alaketu refers to a religiously-centered temple, known as Ilê Maroiá Laji, in the Matatu district of Ketu, one of the oldest of its kind. It was founded by Otampê Ojaró in the early 1600s. Anthropologist Vivaldo da Costa Lima, the first scholar to take interest in the history of the temple, supports this. “Lima gave credence to the memory of Otampê Ojaró's ethnic origin, showing that the temple's nickname, Alaketu, is probably a variant of the Yoruba ara Ketu (people from Ketu), also noting that the surname Ojaró is a variant of Aro, one of Ketu's royal lineages”. One notable characteristic of the religious tradition of the Ketu is its separation from the Catholic traditions of European colonizers.  Olga da Alaketu was actually born into this Afro-Brazilian religious tradition in 1925. She died from complications of diabetes on September 29, 2005, and was buried in the Bosque da Paz Cemetery. She was succeeded by her eldest daughter Jocelina Barbosa Bispo ("Jojó").

References

External links

1920s births
2005 deaths
Deaths from diabetes
Brazilian Candomblés
Iyalawos
Brazilian people of Nigerian descent
Yoruba royalty
Burials in Brazil
Brazilian women
Brazilian people of Yoruba descent
People from Salvador, Bahia